Budhni railway station is a small railway station of Budhni town, Madhya Pradesh. Its code is BNI. The station consist of two platforms. The platforms are not well sheltered. It lacks many facilities including water and sanitation.

Budhni is a small railway station of Bhopal–Nagpur section. Budhni is well connected to Chhindwara, Indore, Bhopal, Gorakhpur Junction, Jhansi, Itarsi, Amritsar and Mumbai.

A 205.5 km new railway line connecting Budni to Indore (Mangaliyagaon) in Madhya Pradesh has been approved by the Cabinet Committee on Economic Affairs.

References

Railway stations in Sehore district
Bhopal railway division